Michael Thornberry (born August 16, 1972) was a United States Army officer who competed in the 1996 Olympic Games in Team Handball, where the team finished in 9th place. He was born in Virginia Beach, Virginia. Thornberry was a 1994 graduate of West Point where he played team handball for 4 years after walking onto the basketball team during his plebe summer and then being kicked off at the start of the academic year.  At the invitation of his math professor, he tried out for the handball team. His math professor at the time was CPT Michael Linnington(who later became the Commandant of Cadets)https://www.woundedwarriorproject.org/mission/leadership/michael-linnington.
Michael went on to participate in the Olympic Festivals in 1993,1994, and 1995.  Upon graduation from West Point he joined the US Men's National Team in Atlanta GA in preparation for the 1996 Olympics.

References

 DoD News

1972 births
Living people
American male handball players
Handball players at the 1996 Summer Olympics
Olympic handball players of the United States
United States Military Academy alumni
Sportspeople from Virginia Beach, Virginia
Handball players at the 2003 Pan American Games
Pan American Games medalists in handball
Pan American Games bronze medalists for the United States
Medalists at the 2003 Pan American Games